Teams Elite is a synchronized skating team from Northbrook, Illinois. Fielding both Senior and Junior level teams.

Programs

Senior

Junior

Competitive highlights

Senior Results

Junior Results since 2018–19

References

Notes

External links 
 Teams Elite Home Page

Junior synchronized skating teams